The Seattle Mariners 1989 season was their 13th since the franchise creation, and the team finished sixth in the American League West, with a record of . The Mariners were led by first-year manager Jim Lefebvre and the season was enlivened by the arrival of nineteen-year-old Ken Griffey Jr., the first overall pick of the 1987 draft.

Offseason
November 15, 1988: Luis DeLeón was signed as a free agent by the Mariners.
In spring training, Ken Griffey Jr. set preseason team records for hits (32), RBIs (20) and total bases (49).

Regular season
Ken Griffey Jr. made his major league baseball debut on opening day, April 3, against the defending league champion Oakland Athletics. Griffey hit a double in his first at-bat. During the 1989 season, Griffey was honored by being selected as card number one in the 1989 Upper Deck baseball card set.
Owner George Argyros sold the team in August to a group headed by Jeff Smulyan of Indianapolis.

Season standings

Record vs. opponents

Notable transactions
 March 27: Steve Balboni was traded by the Mariners to the New York Yankees for Dana Ridenour (minors).
 May 25: Mark Langston and a player to be named later were traded by the Mariners to the Montreal Expos for Randy Johnson, Brian Holman, and Gene Harris. The Mariners completed the deal by sending Mike Campbell to the Expos on July 31.
June 5: Brian Turang was drafted by the Mariners in the 51st round of the 1989 amateur draft.
June 12: Steve Trout was released by the Mariners.

Major league debuts
Batters:
Ken Griffey Jr. (Apr 3)
Omar Vizquel (Apr 3)
Pitchers:
Gene Harris (Apr 5)
Clint Zavaras (June 3)

Roster

Player stats

Batting

Starters by position
Note: Pos = Position; G = Games played; AB = At bats; R = Runs scored; H = Hits; HR = Home runs; RBI = Runs batted in; Avg. = Batting average; SB = Stolen bases

Other batters
Note: G = Games played; AB = At bats; H = Hits; Avg. = Batting average; HR = Home runs; RBI = Runs batted in

Pitching

Starting pitchers
Note: G = Games pitched; IP = Innings pitched; W = Wins; L = Losses; ERA = Earned run average; SO = Strikeouts

Other pitchers
Note: G = Games pitched; IP = Innings pitched; W = Wins; L = Losses; ERA = Earned run average; SO = Strikeouts

Relief pitchers
Note: G = Games pitched; W = Wins; L = Losses; SV = Saves; ERA = Earned run average; SO = Strikeouts

Farm system

References

External links
1989 Seattle Mariners at Baseball Reference.com
1989 Seattle Mariners team page at www.baseball-almanac.com

Seattle Mariners seasons
Seattle Mariners
Seattle Mariners season